Sebastiano Ziani was Doge of Venice from 1172 to 1178. He was one of the greatest planners of Venice. 

During his short term as Doge, Ziani divided the city-state into many districts. He realised that the government headquarters were too close to the shipyard. As such, they were affected by the noise from the shipyard. Ziani resolved this problem by donating a piece of land to the city-state and relocating the shipyard in it. One of the most notable changes he made to the city was in funding the construction of the Piazza San Marco. Projects included filling up Rio Batario that ran parallel to the Basilica San Marco which could be found at what is today the half way point of the Piazza. He paved the main square as well as the Piazzetta that it is connected to. Ziani hired an engineer to erect two columns (possibly of Greek origin) that lie at the head of the Piazzetta facing the lagoon.

He also hosted Pope Alexander III, the Emperor Frederick I, and the delegation of William II of Sicily for the signing of the Treaty of Venice in July 1177. The event was a massive point in Venetian history, providing it with an elevated view among the powerful of Europe and allowing for all to behold the wealth and extravagance of the republic. Ziani was married to a woman named Cecilia.

References

1178 deaths
12th-century Doges of Venice